Leon Thompson (born 1986) is an Irish Gaelic footballer who plays for Naomh Conaill and also, formerly, for the Donegal county team.

He was a panel member when Donegal reached the 2014 All-Ireland Senior Football Championship Final.

Biography
Thompson played in the final of the 2005 Donegal Senior Football Championship as Naomh Conaill won their first ever title. His club also won the 2010 County Final and went on to reach the final of the 2010 Ulster Senior Club Football Championship, knocking out Cavan champions Kingscourt, Monaghan champions Clontibret and Tyrone champions Coalisland along the way. He then played for his club in the final of the 2015 Donegal Senior Football Championship. They won.

Thompson is a veteran of Donegal's 2007 National Football League-winning campaign. When recalled to the senior inter-county panel by Jim McGuinness for winter training in September 2013, he had not played for Donegal since 2009. He maintained his place with the team for their 2014 Ulster Senior Football Championship and the year's All-Ireland Final.

Honours
Donegal
 Ulster Senior Football Championship: 2014
 National Football League: 2007

Naomh Conaill
 Donegal Senior Football Championship: 2005, 2010, 2015

References

1986 births
Living people
Donegal inter-county Gaelic footballers
Naomh Conaill Gaelic footballers